Helophilus intentus is a species of syrphid fly in the family Syrphidae.

References

External links

 

Eristalinae
Articles created by Qbugbot
Insects described in 1922
Hoverflies of North America